Kemar Bailey-Cole (born 10 January 1992) is a male track and field athlete from Jamaica, who mainly competes in the 100m. He is the 2014 Commonwealth Games 100 metres champion.

Career
He qualified for the 2012 Summer Olympics running a personal best 10.00 sec at the Jamaican Olympic trials over 100m coming 5th earning him a spot on the 4×100 relay for Jamaica at the 2012 Summer Olympics. He later improved his time to 9.97 in Brussels on September 7, 2012. He is coached by Glen Mills who also coaches Usain Bolt and Yohan Blake. In 2013 he once again improved his 100m personal best to 9.96 seconds. In the 100m final of the 2013 Jamaican National Championships, Bailey-Cole finished the race in 9.98 seconds, second only to Usain Bolt's 9.94, despite of a 1.5 m/s headwind, where he earned a qualification to the 2013 World Championships in Athletics in Moscow. He set a personal best in the semi final of the 2013 World Championships in Athletics of 9.93 seconds where he came second to teammate Nickel Ashmeade, however he could only manage 4th in the final, just outside the medal positions.

At the 2014 Commonwealth Games Bailey-Cole ran the 100 m final in 10.00 seconds to take the  gold medal, beating England's Adam Gemili who took silver, and fellow countryman Nickel Ashmeade who took bronze. He was a part of the Jamaican relay team which won the gold medal at the 2016 Summer Olympics, running only in the heats.

Personal bests

References

External links

Pace Sports Management Profile
London Olympic Profile

1992 births
Living people
Jamaican male sprinters
Olympic athletes of Jamaica
Olympic gold medalists for Jamaica
Medalists at the 2012 Summer Olympics
Medalists at the 2016 Summer Olympics
Athletes (track and field) at the 2012 Summer Olympics
Athletes (track and field) at the 2016 Summer Olympics
Commonwealth Games gold medallists for Jamaica
Commonwealth Games medallists in athletics
Athletes (track and field) at the 2014 Commonwealth Games
People from Saint Catherine Parish
Olympic gold medalists in athletics (track and field)
Commonwealth Games gold medallists in athletics
World Athletics Championships winners
20th-century Jamaican people
21st-century Jamaican people
Athletes (track and field) at the 2022 Commonwealth Games
Medallists at the 2014 Commonwealth Games